Nicholas Gomez (born 30 October 1964) is a Trinidadian cricketer. He played in one first-class match for Trinidad and Tobago in 1985/86.

See also
 List of Trinidadian representative cricketers

References

External links
 

1964 births
Living people
Trinidad and Tobago cricketers